Isaacs may refer to:

 The Isaacs, a bluegrass Southern gospel music group
 Isaacs (surname)
 Isaacs, Australian Capital Territory, a suburb of Canberra, Australia
 Division of Isaacs, a federal electoral division in Victoria, Australia
 Division of Isaacs (1949–1969), a former Australian Electoral Division

See also
 Isaacs Creek (disambiguation)
 
 Isaac (disambiguation)
 Ishak (disambiguation)
 Izak (disambiguation)
 Zack (disambiguation)
 Izzy (disambiguation)